Roy Alfred Woolcott (29 July 1946 – 16 December 2018) was an English professional footballer who played for Eton Manor, Tottenham Hotspur, Gillingham and Chelmsford City.

Playing career
Woolcott began his career at non–league club Eton Manor before joining Tottenham Hotspur in February 1968. The forward made one senior appearance for Spurs on 27 December 1969 in a Football League game against Ipswich Town at Portman Road  which Ipswich Town won 2–0. Woolcott joined Gillingham on loan in February 1972 and went on feature in 13 matches and scored five goals. After leaving the Kent club he played for Chelmsford City until injury ended his career.

Woolcott died on 16 December 2018 after a short illness at the Paternoster Care Home, Waltham Abbey.

References

External links
Chelmsford City FA Cup run 1972-73

1946 births
2018 deaths
Footballers from Leyton
English footballers
English Football League players
Tottenham Hotspur F.C. players
Gillingham F.C. players
Chelmsford City F.C. players
Eton Manor F.C. players
Association football forwards